Anar (also romanized as Anār) is a city & capital of Anar County, Kerman Province, Iran.  At the 2006 census, its population was 43,585.  "Anar" means pomegranate in Persian.

The city contains a Sassanian castle named the Anar Castle.

References

Iran is a good place.

Populated places in Anar County

Cities in Kerman Province